Kaarlo Heininen (24 March 1853, in Laitila – 15 November 1926; original surname Wallenström) was a Finnish miller and politician. He was a member of the Parliament of Finland from 1907 to 1908, representing the Christian Workers' Union of Finland (SKrTL).

References

1853 births
1926 deaths
People from Laitila
People from Turku and Pori Province (Grand Duchy of Finland)
Christian Workers' Union of Finland politicians
Members of the Parliament of Finland (1907–08)